The Sporting Globe was a newspaper published in Melbourne from 1922 until 1996. The first issue was published on 22 July 1922, and for the first four weeks it was published only on Saturday evenings; from 16 August 1922 it introduced a Wednesday afternoon edition. Printed on pink paper, it was published by Walter R. May for The Herald and Weekly Times at corner Flinders and Russell streets, Melbourne. Initially the Saturday edition was priced at 2d, and the larger Wednesday edition at 3d. With the introduction of the Wednesday edition it also widened its coverage beyond purely sport, acquiring the subtitle "A Journal of Sport, the Stage and the Screen". However, during 1924 it dropped the subtitle and returned to covering purely sport.

The Saturday edition of the newspaper played an important part in Melbourne's football culture, particularly before the introduction of television to Australia in 1956: the newspaper was released one to two hours after the completion of the afternoon's Victorian Football League games, and contained results and match reports. 

Former writers at the newspaper noted that the expansion of television coverage of football reduced the Sporting Globes utility and readership, along with the preference for cars over public transport; ultimately the Saturday evening edition was discontinued in 1979, with the final Wednesday edition being published on 2 September 1996.

References

External links
 

Defunct newspapers published in Melbourne
Publications established in 1922
Publications disestablished in 1996
Weekly newspapers published in Australia
Newspapers on Trove
Sports newspapers published in Australia